In Belize, the Thomas Vincent Ramos Highway takes up where the Hummingbird Highway ends and runs from Dangriga to Punta Gorda. It is entirely paved, with the completion of a 10-mile segment between Golden Stream and Big Falls circa 2008–09.  The TV Ramos Highway provides important access to a number of Mayan ruins and natural areas.  The ancient Mayan sites of Nim Li Punit and Lubaantun are each situated a few miles west of the highway in southern Belize.  The Cockscomb Basin Wildlife Sanctuary is several miles west of the highway in south-central Belize.

In 2011, a project was initiated, and complete by 2015, to extend the Southern Highway 21.4 mi/34.5 km to Jalacte in southwestern Belize.

On September 30, 2020 the Southern Highway was renamed to Thomas Vincent Ramos Highway. It was named after Thomas Vincent Ramos, the creator of Garifuna Settlement Day.

Junction list

References

Roads in Belize
Toledo District
Stann Creek District